Shafter station could refer to:

 Santa Fe Passenger and Freight Depot, a historic train station in Shafter, California
 Revere/Shafter station, a light rail station in San Francisco, California
 Shafter Research Station, an agricultural research station in Shafter, California